Echinochloa crus-galli is a type of wild grass originating from tropical Asia that was formerly classified as a type of panicum grass. It is commonly known as cockspur (or cockspur grass), barnyard millet, Japanese millet, water grass, common barnyard grass, or simply "barnyard grass" (which may refer to any species of Echinochloa or the genus as a whole however). This plant can grow to 60" (1.5 m) in height and has long, flat leaves which are often purplish at the base. Most stems are upright, but some will spread out over the ground. Stems are flattened at the base. The seed heads are a distinctive feature, often purplish, with large millet-like seeds in crowded spikelets.

Considered one of the world's worst weeds, it reduces crop yields and causes forage crops to fail by removing up to 80% of the available soil nitrogen. It acts as a host for several mosaic virus diseases. Heavy infestations can interfere with mechanical harvesting.

Individual plants can produce up to 40,000 seeds per year. Water, birds, insects, machinery, and animal feet disperse it, but contaminated seed is probably the most common dispersal method.

Description

Polymorphous coarse, tufted annual, tall and often weedy; culms erect to decumbent, 0.8–1.5 m tall, rather thick, branching at base.

Leaves flat, glabrous, elongate, 30–50 cm long, 1–2 cm broad, scabrous, slightly thickened at margin; ligules absent; sheaths smooth, lower ones often reddish; panicle 8–30 cm long, green or purple, exerted, somewhat nodding, densely branched, the branches to 5 cm long, erect or ascending sessile;

Spikelets 3–4 mm long, densely arranged on branches, ovoid, often long-awned, pale green to dull purple, short-bristly along veins; racemes spreading, ascending or appressed, the lower somewhat distant, as much as 10 cm long, sometimes branched; glumes and lower lemma minutely hairy on surface with longer more rigid hairs on veins; first glume about two-fifths as long as spikelet, deltoid, the second as long as the spikelet, short-awned; sterile lemma membranous, with a straight scabrous awn, 2–4 cm long or awnless; fertile lemma ovate-elliptic, acute, pale yellow, lustrous, smooth, 3–3.5 mm long. Fl.

Aug.–Oct.; seed maturing Sept.–Oct., up to 40,000/plant. Var. crus-galli has long, somewhat spreading papillose cilia at the summits of the internodes and bases of the branches in the inflorescence and short, very thick papillose cilia along the lateral nerves of the 2nd glume, sterile lemma, and somewhat spreading spikes", and sterile lemmas with awns 0–10 mm long.

Distribution and habitat
Barnyard grass commonly occurs throughout tropical Asia and Africa in fields and along roadsides, ditches, along railway lines, and in disturbed areas such as gravel pits and dumps. It also invades riverbanks and the shores of lakes and ponds. It occurs in all agricultural regions. This species is considered an invasive species in North America where it occurs throughout the continental United States.  It is also found in southern Canada from British Columbia east to Newfoundland. It was first spotted in the Great Lakes region in 1843.

Ecology
Ranging from Boreal Moist to Wet through Tropical Very Dry to Moist forest life zones. Adapted to nearly all types of wet places, this grass is often a common weed in paddy fields, roadsides, cultivated areas, and fallow fields. It grows on variety of wet sites such as ditches, low areas in fertile croplands and wet wastes, often growing in water. Succeeds in cool regions, but better adapted to areas where average annual temperature is 14–16 °C. Not restricted by soil pH.

Usage
E. crus-galli was domesticated in southern Hokkaido 4,500 years ago.

A warm-season grass used as cattle fodder and is sometimes cultivated for this purpose. It is also suited for silage, but not for hay. It is fed green to animals and provides fodder throughout the year; hay made from this plant can be kept up to 6 years. This grass is also used for reclamation of saline and alkaline areas, especially in Egypt.

This grass is readily eaten by wild animals: rabbits, deer, waterfowls, etc.

The grain of some varieties is eaten by humans in times of scarcity and sometimes used for adulterating fennel. The roots are boiled to cure indigestion in the Philippines. The young shoots are eaten as a vegetable. The plant extract is used in diseases of the spleen. Young shoots are eaten as a vegetable in Java. Reported to be preventative and tonic, barnyard grass is a folk remedy in India for carbuncles, haemorrhages, sores, spleen trouble, cancer and wounds.

In the Hisar district of the Indian state of Haryana the seeds of this grass are commonly eaten with cultivated rice grains to make rice pudding or khir on Hindu fast days.

Barnyard grass was one of the five most cultivated crops during Joseon Dynasty in Korea. Rural Development Administration of South Korean government discovered barnyard grass effectively lowers blood sugar and cholesterol when consumed, according to Yonhap.

Japanese barnyard millet (Echinochloa esculenta syn. E. cg. var. utilis), a domesticated form of E. crus-galli, is cultivated on a small scale in Japan, Korea and China. It underwent selection for larger grain size over a span of one or two millennia in Japan.

Diseases and pests
This grass is subject to the brown spot disease caused by Bipolaris oryzae, a fungal infection.

Common names

Punjabi dialect forms
The following Punjabi dialect forms are recorded in Punjab for this grass:
Hisar
 bharti, s.f., Echinochloa crus-galli

Indian languages
 Sanskrit:
 varuka, s.m., a kind of inferior grain, the same name used for Paspalum scrobiculatum and Echinochloa frumentacea
 Marathi:
 barag, s.m., millet, also used for Panicum miliaceum.
Kannada:
 baraga, s.m., baragu, s.n., 1. Panicum frumentaceum, Indian millet; 2. A kind of hill grass from which writing pens are made.
 Malayalam:
 varige, varagu, varaku, s.m., Panicum frumentaceum; a grass Panicum.
 Tamil:
 சாமை  cāmai (சாமி), s.m., A kind of grain, millet. < From Old Indo-Aryan šyāmā s.m., 1. Poor-man's millet, sown in Āvaṇi and maturing in six weeks to four months, Panicum crusgalli. Compare: சிறுசாமை ciṟu-cāmai, n. < id. + சாமை, a kind of little millet, Panicum; சாமைவகை. (சங். அக.); புற்சாமை puṟ-cāmai, n. < id. + a species of little millet, Panicum; சாமைவகை.; பனிச்சாமை paṉi-c-cāmai, n. < பனி + a kind of little millet, Panicum; சாமைவகை. (யாழ். அக.)
 வரகு varaku, s.n. 1. Common millet, Paspalum scrobiculatum; ஒருவகைத் தானியம். புறவுக் கரு வன்ன புன்புல வரகின். 2. Poor man's millet, Echinochloa crusgalli; சாமைவகை. Paspalum scrobiculatum Linn. = P. frumentaceum Rottb. P. crusgalli is not identified in Hooker.
 Telugu:
 చామ  cāma, ṭsāma, pl.m., The millet Panicum miliaceum Also compare బొంతచామలు Panicum frumentaceum< From Old Indo-Aryan šyāmā s.m., 1. Poor-man's millet, sown in Āvaṇi and maturing in six weeks to four months, Echinochloa crusgalli.
 varaga, Inscr. varuvu, n., Panicum miliaceum.

 Non-Indian languages

 Catalan: Serreig.
 Czech: Ježatka kurí noha.
 Danish: Almindelig Hanespore, Hanespore.
 Dutch: Europese Hanepoot.
 Estonian: Tähk-kukehirss.
 Finnish: Rikkakananhirssi.
 French: Echinochloa pied-de-coq, Panic pied de coq.
 Italian: Giavone comune, Giavone, Panicastrella.
 Japanese:いぬびえ inubie
 Khmer: Smao bek kbol
 Korean: 피(pi) or 피쌀(pissal)
 Norwegian: Hønsehirse.
 Portuguese: Capim-arroz
 Serbo-Croatian: kostrva, kostrava, koštriva, kostrina, proso brkato, korovsko proso, veli muhić, veliki muhar, kokonožac, konopljena trava, svrakanj
 Aragon'': cola de caballo, mutxitxa
 Tai Lue: ᦛᧂ wang
 Thai: หญ้าปล้องละมาน yaa-plong-lamaan
 Vietnamese''': .

Notes

crus-galli
Millets
Flora of Europe
Flora of temperate Asia
Flora of tropical Asia
Cereals